A wall is a solid structure that provides a barrier or enclosure.

Wall, WALL, or The Wall may also refer to:

Arts and entertainment

Films
 Wall (Original French title: "Mur"), a French–Israeli film about the Israeli West Bank barrier
 The Wall (1962 film), an American propaganda film about the erection of the Berlin Wall
 The Wall (1967 film), a 1967 French drama
 Deewaar (The Wall), a 1975 Indian crime drama directed by Yash Chopra
 Pink Floyd – The Wall, a 1982 film based on the music album by Pink Floyd
 The Wall, a 1982 Holocaust drama starring Tom Conti
 The Wall (1998 American film), a 1998 TV film
 The Wall (1998 Belgian film), a Belgian tragicomedy film by Alain Berliner
 The Wall (2011 film), a 2011 French film
 The Wall (2012 film), a 2012 Austrian film
 The Wall (2017 film), a war film starring Aaron Taylor-Johnson and John Cena

Literature
 The Wall (A Song of Ice and Fire), a structure within the world of the epic fantasy novel series by George R. R. Martin
 The Wall (Bykaŭ short story collection), by Belarusian writer Vasil Bykaŭ, 1997
 The Wall (novel), by Austrian writer Marlen Haushofer, 1963
 The Wall (Sartre short story collection), by French writer Jean-Paul Sartre, 1939
 The Wall, a novel by John Hersey about the Warsaw Ghetto, 1950
 The Wall, a novel by John Lanchester set in a future dystopian Britain, 2019
 The Wall, a novel by Mary Roberts Rinehart, 1938
 The Wall, a novel by William Sutcliffe, 2013
 The Wall, a novel by Peter Vansittart, 1990
 The Wall: Growing Up Behind the Iron Curtain, a children's book by Peter Sís, 2007

Music

Bands
 The Wall (band), a punk rock band formed in 1978
 Bức Tường (The Wall), a Vietnamese glam metal bands

Albums
 The Wall, an album by Pink Floyd released in 1979

Concerts and tours
 The Wall Tour (1980–81), a 1980–81 tour to promote the Pink Floyd album The Wall
 The Wall – Live in Berlin, a 1990 charity concert by Roger Waters after his departure from Pink Floyd
 The Wall Live (2010–13), a 2010-13 tour by Roger Waters

Songs
 "The Wall" (1957 song), a song from 1957 by Patti Page
 "The Wall" (Willie Nelson song), a 2013 song written by country music singer Willie Nelson
 "The Wall" (Michelle Wright song), a 1994 song by Michelle Wright
 "The Wall", a song by Johnny Cash on the 1968 album At Folsom Prison
 "The Wall", a song by Kansas on the 1976 album Leftoverture
 "The Wall", a 2011 song by Yuck
 "The Wall", a song composed by Ramin Djawadi on the 2011 soundtrack of Game of Thrones
 "The Wall", a song by Bruce Springsteen on the 2014 album High Hopes
 "The Wall", a song composed by Thomas Newman on the 2015 soundtrack of Bridge of Spies
 "The Wall", a song by Hong Kong rock band Beyond (1992)
 "La Pared" ("The Wall"), a song by Shakira on the 2005 album Fijación Oral, Vol. I

Television

Programs and series
 The Wall (American game show), a 2017 American television game show
 The Wall (Australian game show), a 2017 Australian television game show based on the American version
 The Wall (British game show), a 2019 British television game show based on the American version
 The Wall (Chilean game show), the 2018 Chilean adaptation of the American game show with Rafael Araneda
The Wall Philippines, a 2021 Philippine television game show based on the American version
 The Wall (2008 TV series), a 2008 British comedy television programme debuting in 2008
 The Wall Song, a 2020 Thai television game show
 La Faille a 2019 French Canadian TV series, referred to as The Wall in some markets

Episodes and events
 "The Wall" (Heroes), an episode of the television series Heroes
 "The Wall" (The Twilight Zone), a 1989 episode of the television series The Twilight Zone
 "The Wall" (The Unit), an episode of the television series The Unit
 "The Wall", an episode of the TV series Alvin and the Chipmunks
 The Wall, an event from the TV series Gladiators

Other uses in arts and entertainment
 Wall (play), a 2009 play by David Hare
 The Wall (SoHo), a piece of art

Brands and enterprises
 WALL, an AM radio station in Middletown, New York, United States
 Wall, a chain of music stores owned in 1997 by WHSmith and acquired in 1998 by Camelot Music

People
 Wall (surname), list of notable people with the surname
 Rahul Dravid, an Indian cricketer nicknamed "The Wall"
 Jerry Tuite, a deceased WCW professional wrestler, whose ring name was "The Wall"

Places

Canada
 The Wall, structure in Fermont, Quebec

United Kingdom
 Wall, Northumberland, England
 Wall, Staffordshire, England

United States
 Wall, Pennsylvania
 Wall, South Dakota
 Wall, Texas
 The Wall (mountain), a mountain in the Teton Range, Grand Teton National Park, Wyoming
 Wall Creek, Oregon
 Wall Street, the financial district of New York City
 Wall Township, New Jersey

Science and technology
 Wall (butterfly) or Lasiommata megera, a butterfly in the family Nymphalidae
 Facebook Wall, a feature on Facebook that allows users to post comments and links on their friends' profile pages
 Galaxy wall, a subtype of galaxy filament

Other uses
 The Wall, the Memorial Wall of the Vietnam Veterans Memorial
 Sultan Aji Muhammad Sulaiman Airport (ICAO: WALL), Balikpapan, East Kalimantan, Indonesia
 Trump wall, an expansion to the U.S.–Mexico border wall
 Green Monster (sometimes known as "The Wall"), a feature at Fenway Park in Boston
 Wall bang, to shoot someone through a wall or object in videogames

See also
 Wall Street (disambiguation)
 Wall's (disambiguation)
 Walls (disambiguation)
 
 
 Wal (disambiguation)
 Walle (name)